South Union Street Historic District is a national historic district located at Concord, Cabarrus County, North Carolina.  The district encompasses 69 contributing buildings in a predominantly residential section of Concord.  The district developed after 1880 and includes notable examples of Late Victorian and Bungalow / American Craftsman style residences.

It was listed on the National Register of Historic Places in 1986.

References

Historic districts on the National Register of Historic Places in North Carolina
Victorian architecture in North Carolina
Buildings and structures in Cabarrus County, North Carolina
National Register of Historic Places in Cabarrus County, North Carolina